The Hawk Swings is an album by saxophonist Coleman Hawkins which was recorded in 1960 and released on the Crown label.

Reception

Matt Collar of AllMusic states, "the album is a great example of the Hawk's swinging, mainstream jazz style and shows how vital the swing-era style remained well into the modern jazz era".

Track listing
All compositions by Coleman Hawkins
 "Cloudy" – 5:36
 "Almost Dawn" – 8:56
 "Stake Out" – 6:15
 "Cross Town" – 5:04
 "Shadows" – 5:42

Personnel
Coleman Hawkins – tenor saxophone
Thad Jones – trumpet
Eddie Costa – piano, vibraphone
George Duvivier – bass
Osie Johnson – drums

References

Coleman Hawkins albums
1961 albums
Crown Records albums